Big Bill is a nickname that may refer to:

 Bill Abstein (1883–1940), American Major League Baseball and amateur soccer player
 Bill Bachrach (1879–1959), American swim and water polo coach
 Bill Bagwell (1895–1976), American Major League Baseball player
 Big Bill Bissonnette (1937–2018), American jazz trombonist and producer
 Big Bill Broonzy (1903–1958), American blues singer and guitarist
 William Stephen Devery (1854–1919), New York City Police superintendent and first police chief, later co-owner of the New York Yankees baseball team
 Bill Dwyer (mobster) (1883–1946), prohibition gangster and bootlegger
 Big Bill Edwards (1877–1943), American college football player
 Bill France Sr. (1909–1992), American racing driver, co-founder, Chairman and CEO of NASCAR
 Bill Gatewood (1881–1962), American Negro league baseball player and manager
 Bill Haywood (1869–1928), a prominent figure of the American labor movement
 Bill Hollenback (1886–1968), American college football Hall-of-Fame player and coach
 Bill James (pitcher, born 1887) (1887–1942), Major League Baseball pitcher
 Bill Kemmer (1873–1945), American Major League Baseball player 
 Bill Lee (right-handed pitcher) (1909–1977), Major League Baseball pitcher
 Big Bill Morganfield (born 1956), American blues singer and guitarist
 W. Morrisey (born 1986), American professional wrestler
 Big Bill Neidjie (–2002), last surviving speaker of the Gagudju language
 Big Bill Smith (1869–?), American Negro league baseball player and manager
 William Howard Taft (1857–1930), 27th President of the United States
 William Hale Thompson (1869–1944), mayor of Chicago
 Bill Tilden (1893–1953), American tennis player
 Bill Verna (born 1929), Australian professional wrestler
 Bill Voiselle (1919–2005), Major League Baseball pitcher
 William Watson (decathlete) (1916–1973), first African-American to win the national decathlon championship
 Bill Werbeniuk (1947–2003), Canadian snooker player

See also
 Little Bill (disambiguation)

Lists of people by nickname